The members of Lesxi Filon Ari elected Thanasis Athanasiadis as the new president of Aris Thessaloniki in the elections that took place in May.

The club finished 5th in regular season of Super League and 4th after playoffs. Also, the club reached in the final of Greek Cup where lost by Panathinaikos. Aris Thessaloniki's fans made the biggest movement of fans in Greece for the final.

Aris Thessaloniki started the season with Iomar Mazinho. In November Mazinho removed and Héctor Cúper was the manager for the rest of the season.

First-team squad

Transfers and loans

Transfers in

Transfers out

Loans In

Loans Out

Competitions

Overall

Overview

{| class="wikitable" style="text-align: center"
|-
!rowspan=2|Competition
!colspan=8|Record
|-
!
!
!
!
!
!
!
!
|-
| Super League

|-
| Greek Cup

|-
! Total

{| class="wikitable" style="text-align: center"
|-
!rowspan=2|Super League
!colspan=8|Record
|-
!
!
!
!
!
!
!
!
|-
| Regular Season

|-
| Play-offs

|-
! Total

Managers' overview

Iomar Mazinho
{| class="wikitable" style="text-align: center"
|-
!rowspan=2|Competition
!colspan=8|Record
|-
!
!
!
!
!
!
!
!
|-
| Super League

|-
| Greek Cup

|-
! Total

Héctor Cúper
{| class="wikitable" style="text-align: center"
|-
!rowspan=2|Competition
!colspan=8|Record
|-
!
!
!
!
!
!
!
!
|-
| Super League

|-
| Greek Cup

|-
! Total

Super League

Regular season

League table

Results summary

Results by matchday

Matches

Play-offs
Team that finished fifth in Regular Season started Play-offs with 0 points. Every other team's points is the difference from fifth placed team divided with 5.

The teams started Play-offs with the following points:
 Olympiacos – 4 points [(64–46) / 5 = 3.6, rounded to 4]
 PAOK – 3 points [(62–46) / 5 = 3.2, rounded to 3]
 AEK Athens – 1 point [(53–46) / 5 = 1.4, rounded to 1]
 Aris Thessaloniki – 0 points [(46–46) / 5 = 0]

League table

Results summary

Matches

Greek Football Cup

Fourth Round

Fifth Round

Quarter-finals

Quarter-finals Replay

Semi-finals

Final
The 68th Greek Cup Final was played at Athens Olympic Stadium "Spyridon Louis" on Saturday, April 24, 2010.

MATCH OFFICIALS
Assistant referees:
K. Dallas
D. Tatsis
Fourth official: M. Koukoulakis

MATCH RULES
90 minutes.
30 minutes of extra time if necessary.
Penalty shootout if scores still level.
Seven named substitutes.
Maximum of 3 substitutions.

Squad statistics

Appearances

Players with no appearances not included in the list.

Goals

Clean sheets

References

External links
 Aris Thessaloniki F.C. official website
 Aris Thessaloniki FC on Superleaguegreece.net

Greek football clubs 2009–10 season
2009-10